Choozhal, Krishnapuram, Piracode is located nearly 60 km  from Kanyakumari and 40 km from Trivandrum.  It is considered as one of the extreme border of Kerala, India.

It comes under Munchirai Municipality. It consists of a lot of Churches and Temples among them are Choozhal-Piracode Sree Krishna Swamy Temple, Pammakkulangara Sree Bhadrakali Temple (Famous for Iratta Ponkala), Madathu Nada Sree Dharma Shastha Temple, St Little Flower Msc Church, St Joseph Msc Church,St Thomas MSC church Ambilikonam, St Micheal's Church Choozhal, Kingdom Hall of Jehovah's Witnesses at Choozhal Junction.

People in Choozhal are mainly farmers, Govt Employees (Lt Col Somasekharan Nair is the first Army Officer from the village). K. Surendran, former secretary of The Temple passed a few years back. Another unfortunate incident took place, Mr Shyin Lal S/o Mr K Surendran also left on the day of annual day function in remembrance of Mr K Surendran.

Choozhal is situated just 4 km from Parassala Kerala and 6 km from Kaliyakkavilai Tamil Nadu.  Well connected with bus, rail and air.  Nearest Railway Station, Parassala situated just 4 km (Approximate) away from Choozhal. Its coordinates are : 8°19'9"N 77°7'43"E in wikimapia.India and the Time Zone is UTC+5:30 (IST).

Sree Krishna Swamy Temple, Choozhal, Piracode, Krishnapuram 
The main attraction of Choozhal is the Choozhal-Piracode Sree Krishna Swamy Temple. The temple celebrates its annual festival during the month of February - March, known as Kumbha Rohini Mahotsavam.  In the early days, the village is known as Shankurutty.  After a period of time, the name of the village was name Krishnapuram which originated from the name of the Lord Sree Krishna. Once upon a time, this temple was a bhajan mandir and Uriyadi with Bhajana Pattabhishekeam (annual festival) was conducted regularly. Sivasankara Panicker presided over the temple committee for a long period. Then it was demolished in 1973 and new Shri Krishna temple was constructed with the effective participation of the public on 17 April 1979 by a committee presided by K. Govindan Panicker a nd K.G. Panicker. Notable services were contributed by Sadanandan  and K. Surendran for about 18 years. The present temple was reconstructed in 18.02.2008 with the help of natives. There is also a Bhadrakali Temple situated in Piracode, opposite to Krishanpuram famous for Iratta Ponkala. 
Kumbharohini Maholsavam for the year 2015, started on 17 Feb 2015 and ended on 26 Feb 2015. The main event of the festival 'Khoshayatra' was conducted on the second day of the festival which was 18 Feb 2015. The procession started from Sree Subramanya Swamy temple Kollemcode at 3 in the afternoon and ended at Sree Krishna Swamy temple premises by around 7 in the evening. Samoohasadhya is arranged for all the devotees for all the ten days of the festival.

Club (Youth social services)
A Youths Social Services Society (YSS) located at Krishnapuram performing duties of social services in the area, a helpful society for the villagers. The facilities include a library with a huge collection of books, and Information room and a Public Television Room.  The Club celebrates its annual function during the month of August to September in connection with Onam festival, by conducting various programmes which include Sports, Arts, Quiz, etc.  The club also promotes students of 10th and 12th by presenting a trophy to those students who topped with marks. Great efforts were made by sri. Jayamohan&shaji in the construction of own building of YSS. YUVASAMITHI, a handwritten periodical reflecting contemporary youths literature of choozhal published in the 1970-80s are stored in the library still inspires nostalgia of the residents. The services rendered by, Shri. Rajmohan, Chandran, Sreekumar, late  Shri. Ponnian, Raveendran, Johnson, Surendran, Monikandan, Siddarthan are ever remembered.

References

Villages in Kanyakumari district